The South Park Psycho is the first album by the rapper Ganksta N-I-P. It was released on February 25, 1992, through Rap-a-Lot Records. The album has production from Ganksta N-I-P, The Terrorists, John Bido and Doug King. The album is one of the earliest examples of the horrorcore genre, and considered by many as a Southern hip hop classic.

Guest artists include future routine collaborators, Dope-E, K-Rino, and Seagram. Willie D and Scarface, then of the Geto Boys, also appear on the track "Actions Speak Louder Than Words". This song also appears on the Geto Boys' first greatest hits collection, the 1992 release, Uncut Dope: Geto Boys' Best.

Reception

The album peaked at No. 63 on the US Billboard Top R&B/Hip-Hop Albums chart. The album has long been out-of-print. It gained four stars out of five from AllMusic. The album sold around 100,000 units around the South Park area and helped N-I-P to obtain a recording contract with Priority Records. The song "Psycho" was ranked No. 3 most violent hip hop song of all time by Complex.

Track listing
"Intro" – 1:58 (Producer: Dope-E)
"Horror Movie Rap" – 3:35 (Producer: Egypt E)
"Get Out Of The Game" – 5:14 (feat. Dope-E)
"Rough Brothers From South Park" – 5:24 (feat. K-Rino, Dope-E, Point Blank)
"Black Godfather" – 5:03
"Psycho" – 4:20
"Action Speaks Louder Than Words" – 5:53 (feat. Scarface, Willie D, Seagram)
"Ganksta Mac" – 4:43
"Smokin Amp" – 3:55
"Disgusting" – 4:39
"H Town" – 4:44 (Producer: Dope-E)
"Slaughter" – 4:19
"Paranoid" – 4:36
"Damned Shame" – 4:20

Samples
"Horror Movie Rap": Soundtrack from Halloween
"Psycho": "CEBU" by Commodores
"Action Speaks Louder Than Words": "Action Speaks Louder Than Words" by Chocolate Milk
"Disgusting": "Nautilus" by Bob James
"Slaughter": "Straight Outta Compton" by N.W.A
"Paranoid": "Stranglehold" by Ted Nugent
"Damned Shame": "Dead Homiez" by Ice Cube

Later samples
"Psycho"
"That's How It Is: Psychic, Pt. 2"  on the album Psychic Thoughtsby Ganksta N-I-P
"Fuck You" on the album Psychic Thoughts by Ganksta N-I-P
"Still Psycho" on the album Still Psycho by Ganksta N-I-P
"The Violence of the Lambs"  on the album Acid Reflexby Paris
"Paranoid"
"Skitso" on the album Little Big Man by Bushwick Bill

Credits
Engineer: Peter Reardon
Mixed by: Bido
Production co-ordinator: Tony Randle
Producer: Crazy C, Doug King, Ganksta N-I-P*, John Bido, The Terrorists
Written by: Dope E, Ganksta N-I-P, Scarface, Seagram, Willie D

Charts

References

1992 albums
Ganksta N-I-P albums
Rap-A-Lot Records albums
Horrorcore albums